The 2016 J.League Cup (also known as the 2016 J.League Yamazaki Nabisco Cup, later changed to 2016 J.League YBC Levain Cup for sponsoring purposes) is the 41st edition of the most prestigious Japanese football league cup tournament and the 24th edition under the current J.League Cup format.

Format
Teams from the J1 League will take part in the tournament. Sanfrecce Hiroshima, Gamba Osaka, Urawa Red Diamonds and FC Tokyo were given a bye to the quarter-finals due to qualification in the 2016 AFC Champions League. The remaining 14 teams started from the group stage, where they were divided into two groups of seven. The group winners and the runners-up of each group qualified for the quarter-final along with the four teams which qualified for the AFC Champions League.

Group stage
All times are Japan Standard Time (UTC+9)

Group A

Matches

Group B

Matches

Knock-out stage
All times are Japan Standard Time (UTC+9)

Quarter-finals

First leg

Second leg

2–2 on aggregate. Yokohama F. Marinos won on away goals

Urawa Red Diamonds won 6-1 on aggregate.

Gamba Osaka won 7-4 on aggregate.

FC Tokyo won 3-1 on aggregate.

Semi-finals

First leg

Second leg

1–1 on aggregate. Gamba Osaka won on away goals

Urawa Red Diamonds won 5-2 on aggregate.

Final

Top scorers

Updated to games played on 15 October 2016Names of players in bold are still active.
Source: J. League Data

References

J.League Cup
2016 in Japanese football
Japan League Cup